This is a list of the squads with their players that competed at the 2014–15 LEN Champions League.

CNA Barceloneta

AN Brescia

ZF Eger

Galatasaray

JUG Dubrovnik

Olympiacos

Partizan

VK Primorje

VK Radnički

Pro Recco

Spandau04

Szolnoki Vsk

References

2014–15 LEN Champions League
Champions League